The 2001 Kroger St. Jude International was a men's tennis tournament played on indoor hard courts at the Racquet Club of Memphis in Memphis, Tennessee in the United States that was part of the International Series Gold of the 2001 ATP Tour. It was the 31st edition of the tournament and was held from February 19 through February 25, 2001. Second-seeded Mark Philippoussis won the singles title.

Finals

Singles

 Mark Philippoussis defeated  Davide Sanguinetti 6–3, 6–7(5–7), 6–3
 It was Philippoussis' only title of the year and the 12th of his career.

Doubles

 Bob Bryan /  Mike Bryan defeated  Alex O'Brien /  Jonathan Stark 6–3, 7–6(7–3)
 It was Bob Bryan's 1st title of the year and the 1st of his career. It was Mike Bryan's 1st title of the year and the 1st of his career.

References

External links
 Official website
 ITF tournament edition details

 
Kroger St. Jude International
Kroger St. Jude International
Kroger St. Jude International
Kroger St. Jude International